The European Research Center for Information Systems (ERCIS) was founded in 2004 at the University of Münster in Münster, North Rhine-Westphalia, Germany. The objective of ERCIS is connecting research in Information systems with Business, Computer Science, Communication Sciences, Law, Management and Mathematics. The ERCIS consists of leading national and international universities and companies in the field of Information Systems.

Associated Member Institutions
Associated member institutions of the European Research Center for Information Systems are:

Advisory board

 arvato Supply Chain Solutions
 Bison Deutschland GmbH
 Christ Juweliere und Uhrmacher seit 1863 GmbH
 CLAAS
 cronos Unternehmensberatung GmbH
 DMI Archivierung
 Hilti Corporation
 Informationsfabrik
 IQ-optimize
 Lidl
 PICTURE GmbH
 Provinzial
 SAP AG
 viadee IT-Unternehmensberatung
 Westfalen Group
 Zeb.rolfes.schierenbeck.associates gmbh

References

External links
 European Research Center for Information Systems (ERCIS)
 Department of Information Systems at the University of Muenster

Information technology organizations based in Europe
Information systems
Information technology management
Management organizations
University of Münster